Vicente Spiteri (11 December 1917 – 8 November 2003) was a Spanish conductor.

Spanish conductors (music)
Male conductors (music)
1917 births
2003 deaths
20th-century Spanish musicians
20th-century conductors (music)
20th-century Spanish male musicians